The Central District of Bonab County is in East Azerbaijan province, Iran. At the 2006 census, its population was 125,209 in 31,921 households. The following census in 2011 counted 129,795 people in 37,353 households. At the latest census in 2016, the district had 134,892 inhabitants living in 42,325 households.

References 

Bonab County

Districts of East Azerbaijan Province

Populated places in East Azerbaijan Province

Populated places in Bonab County